The Pakistan cricket team toured Zimbabwe for a three-match Test series and a three-match One Day International (ODI) series between 31 January and 26 February 1995. The Test series was won 2–1 by Pakistan and the ODI series was drawn 1–1. Zimbabwe's win in the first match of the Test series was their first since becoming a Test nation.

Test series

1st Test

2nd Test

3rd Test

ODI series

1st ODI

2nd ODI

3rd ODI

References

External links
 

1995 in Pakistani cricket
1995 in Zimbabwean cricket
International cricket competitions from 1994–95 to 1997
1994-95
Zimbabwean cricket seasons from 1980–81 to 1999–2000